"Is Anybody Goin' to San Antone" is a song written by Glenn Martin and Dave Kirby, and recorded by American country music artist Charley Pride.  It was released in February 1970 as the first single from the album Charley Pride's 10th Album.  The song was Pride's third number one in a row on the country charts.  The single spent two weeks at number one and a total of 16 weeks on the country chart.

Background
Pride's manager, Jack D. Johnson, was given a demonstration tape of this song and rewrote it, changing the chords, lyrics, and arrangement to better fit his client, Charley Pride. Pride recorded and made this rewrite his third number-one hit.  Jack did not take songwriter's credit, as he was working for the success of his client.  Jack wrote other songs, including "Too Hard To Say I'm Sorry", also sung by Charley Pride, cowritten with Jack Clement.

Chart performance

Cover Versions
Nancy Sinatra recorded a version of the song which was featured on the B-side of her 1971 single, "Hook And Ladder". The song was included on her 2009 digital only collection, Cherry Smiles – The Rare Singles.
The song was also a popular part of the repertoire of legendary Texas musician and San Antonio native, Doug Sahm, who recorded it in 1973 for his album Doug Sahm and Band, then again in 1991 with his group, the Texas Tornados.
Bengt Palmers wrote lyrics in Swedish, Kan ingen tala om för mig när tåget går? ("Can anybody tell me when the train departs"), allowing Siv-Inger Svensson to score a Svensktoppen hit for six weeks during 10 February – 17 March 1974 period, peaking at fourth place. 
In 2008, Swedish dansband Drifters covered the song with these lyrics on the cover album Tycker om dig: Svängiga låtar från förr.

Popular culture
In his live 1994 album from The Birchmere in Virginia titled "Night After Night", Jerry Jeff Walker tips his hat to Charley Pride with a riff on Sangria Wine " with the lines- "Is Anybody Goin to San Antone or Phoenix, Arizona? Anyplace is all right as long as I don't have to go to Waco."

References

1970 singles
1970 songs
Charley Pride songs
Nancy Sinatra songs
Song recordings produced by Jack Clement
RCA Records singles
Songs about cities in the United States
Songs about Texas
Drifters (Swedish band) songs